Always in the Way is a 1915 American silent drama film directed by J. Searle Dawley and starring Mary Miles Minter. The film, which was inspired by the song of the same name by Charles K. Harris, was partially filmed in the Bahamas. As with many of Minter's features, the film is thought to be a lost film.

Plot

As described in film magazines, Winfred North, a widower, marries a widow with two children, believing this will be best for his five-year-old daughter, Dorothy. When her step-mother discovers that Dorothy is to inherit the entirety of her father's fortune, she passes her off as an orphan, and has her adopted by a missionary couple who take the little girl to Africa.

Now aged fifteen, Dorothy is aiding her adoptive father Revered Goodwin in his missionary work, when she meets Robert Armstrong, a prospector, and they become sweethearts. However, the natives take up arms and kill Dorothy's adoptive parents. Dorothy is rescued and taken to New York, where she begins to work in a florist's shop. Armstrong also returns to New York and searches relentlessly for Dorothy. By a series of coincidences he becomes acquainted first with Winfred North, and then with a former friend of Dorothy's step-mother, who reveals what the step-mother has done.

In the meantime, Dorothy tells her story to a journalist with whom she shares her boarding house. When Armstrong reads the subsequent article, he is finally able to find his lost sweetheart. He re-unites Dorothy with her father, who promptly denounces the step-mother, and the young couple are engaged.

The July 10th, 1915 edition of Motion Picture News lists a musical cue sheet for the film.

Cast
 Mary Miles Minter as Dorothy North
 Ethelmary Oakland as Dorothy North (child)
 Lowell Sherman as Winfred North
 Edna Holland as Mrs. Helen Stillwell
 Mabel Greene as May Stillwell
 Harold Meltzer as Alan Stillwell
 Arthur Evers as Reverend Goodwin
 Charlotte Shelby as Mrs. Goodwin
 Franklin B. Coates as Robert Armstrong

References

External links

1915 films
1915 drama films
Silent American drama films
American silent feature films
American black-and-white films
Films based on songs
Films shot in the Bahamas
Metro Pictures films
Films directed by J. Searle Dawley
1910s American films